A displacer is a special-purpose piston, used in Beta and Gamma type Stirling engines.

Displacer may also refer to:
 Displacer (band), a Toronto band
 Displacer beast, a fictional creature in Dungeons & Dragons